Kord Mahalleh (also Romanized as Kord Maḩalleh) is a village in Kelardasht-e Gharbi Rural District, Kelardasht District, Chalus County, Mazandaran Province, Iran. At the 2006 census, its population was 603, in 179 families.

References 

Populated places in Chalus County